The Dutch Reformed Church is a Dutch Reformed church in Franschhoek, South Africa. The church was built in 1847 and is situated on the main road running through the town. This valley, tightly hemmed in by mountains, is named after the French Huguenots who fled to the Cape after religious persecution in 1688. They brought with them knowledge of viniculture and settled to make wine.

In 1923 a new organ was purchased at a cost of £1,200 (equivalent to £212,400 in 2013 or about R3,800,00 in 2013). In 1926, the presbytery completely renovated which also involved substantial costs for the church with it. From 1929 on services in the church were held in Afrikaans instead of Dutch. The first Afrikaans church council minutes dating from December 1929 From 1933 uses Afrikaans Bibles and from 1937 used with an Afrikaans Psalter.

In the years 1967 and 1968 the building was extensively restored at a cost of R60,000 (equivalent to roughly R5,000,000 in 2013) with restorations completed on 16 and 17 November 1968. An earthquake occurred a year later causing only minor damage to the building due to the restoration work completed the previous year. The building was declared Nasionale Memorable in 1972. During the ministry of Rev. Muller. In 1975, the building is equipped with a sound system.

List of ministers

 Pieter Nicolaas Ham, 1845-1864
 Johannes Gerhardus Olivier, 1869-1873
 Jacobus George Joubert Krige, 1873-1881
 Pieter Daniël Rossouw, 1881-1883
 Jan Andries Beyers, 1884-1889
 Andries Francois Malan, 1889-1889 and 1899-1919
 Pieter Jozef Cruze, 1892-1894
 Stefanus Jacobus Perold, 1895-1898
 Adriaan Jacobus van Wijk, 1919-1943
 Zacharias Blomerus Loots, 1943-1947
 Marthinus Smuts Louw, 1947-1964
 Gys Muller, 1965-1985
 Willem Jakobus van Zyl, 1985-2000

Gallery

References

Churches in the Western Cape
Dutch Reformed Church buildings
Buildings and structures in the Western Cape
Huguenot history in South Africa
Churches completed in 1847
1847 establishments in the Cape Colony
19th-century religious buildings and structures in South Africa